Andersson's Kalle (Swedish: Anderssonskans Kalle) may refer to: 

 Andersson's Kalle, a 1901 novel by Emil Norlander
 Andersson's Kalle (1922 film), a silent Swedish film directed by Sigurd Wallén
 New Pranks of Andersson's Kalle, a 1923 silent Swedish film directed by Sigurd Wallén
 Andersson's Kalle (1934 film), a Swedish film directed by Sigurd Wallén
 Andersson's Kalle (1950 film), a Swedish film directed by Rolf Husberg
 Andersson's Kalle (1972 film), a Swedish film directed by Arne Stivell
 Andersson's Kalle on Top Form, a 1973 Swedish film directed by Arne Stivell